Thorstein Stryken (3 December 1900 – 21 September 1965) was a Norwegian cyclist. He competed in two events at the 1920 Summer Olympics.

References

External links
 

1900 births
1965 deaths
Norwegian male cyclists
Olympic cyclists of Norway
Cyclists at the 1920 Summer Olympics
People from Jessheim
Sportspeople from Viken (county)